Walter de Cusack (c.1270- 1334) was an Anglo-Irish judge, magnate and military commander of the fourteenth century. 

He was a younger son of Sir Andrew Cusack of Gerrardstown, County Meath. They belonged to the leading Anglo-Irish Cusack family, who came to Ireland soon after the Norman Conquest of Ireland in the late twelfth century and settled mainly in County Meath. Sir Andrew was a younger son of Geoffrey de Cusack, Lord of Killeen. Nicholas Cusack, Bishop of Kildare 1279-99, was a cousin.

Walter was summoned by King Edward I for military service in the  First War of Scottish Independence in 1303 and 1307, and probably on two or three later occasions. He sat in the Irish Parliament in 1310. He was appointed Chief Justice in Eyre (i.e. Chief Itinerant justice) in 1308, and was reappointed a justice itinerant in 1310, for County Dublin only (the eyre system was quickly being wound down). There is an interesting instruction in the Patent Roll to Walter and his fellow justices to decide cases concerning real property according to Irish law rather than English law: this is evidence that the two legal systems were already quite distinct. Shortly afterwards the eyre was cancelled, apparently due to continuing difficulties about which legal system was being used. He served as Deputy Justiciar of Ireland, and was a justice of the Justiciar's Court in 1317–18.

He was politically a close ally of the Justiciar, Roger Mortimer, 1st Earl of March, in the years 1316-8, and was steward of his Irish estates. For this reason his loyalty to King Edward II in the final crisis of his reign, which ended with the King's deposition and murder at Mortimer's hands, has been questioned: he was accused of plotting treason, but the charges did not stick.

He may have seen service during the Scottish Invasion of Ireland of 1315-18, as his son John undoubtedly did. About a year after the final defeat of the invasion, John petitioned the Council for compensation for his own and his father's losses in the King's service. The Privy  Council, noting that John, but not apparently his father, was present at the Battle of Faughart in October 1318, where Edward Bruce, the leader of the invading army, was killed, recommended that John be awarded 50 marks (half what he had asked for).

He married firstly Matilda, daughter and co-heiress with her sister Isabella (who married Adam, eighth Lord of Howth) of William  Pylate of Pylatestown (now Pelletstown, near Cabra, Dublin). He married secondly, after 1310, Amicia, widow of Nigel le Brun of Roebuck, Dublin, Escheator of Ireland. Through his second marriage he acquired Knocktopher Castle in County Kilkenny, which Nigel and Amicia had purchased from Sir Walter de la Haye, the former Justiciar, in 1309. It passed to the Butler dynasty soon after his death. His marriage to  Amicia was technically an offence since it seems that he did not have the King's permission to marry,  which was required in the case of a widow. However, obtaining a pardon for this transgression was easy enough. 

He died in 1334, leaving issue from his first marriage, including Simon Cusack, Lord of Dangan Castle, and John Cusack of Belpere. His descendants were mainly associated with Cushinstown in County Meath. They included Sir Thomas Cusack, Lord Chancellor of Ireland, who died in 1571.

Sources
Ball, F. Elrington The Judges in Ireland 1221-1921 London John Murray 1926
Burke's Landed Gentry of Great Britain and Ireland London Henry Colburn 1850
Dodd, Gwilym and Musson, Anthony, ed. The Reign of Edward  II: New Perspectives York Medieval Press 2006
Lodge, John Peerage of Ireland Moore and Co College Green Dublin 1789
Patent Rolls Edward II 
Smith, Brendan Colonisation and Conquest in Medieval Ireland: The English in Louth 1170-1330 Cambridge University Press 1999

Notes

14th-century Irish judges
People from County Meath
Members of the Parliament of Ireland (pre-1801)
1334 deaths